Xerocrassa roblesi is a species of air-breathing land snail, a pulmonate gastropod mollusk in the family Geomitridae.

Distribution

This species is endemic to Spain, where it is restricted to the natural reserve of the Serra Calderona in the north of the province of Valencia.

References

 Bank, R. A.; Neubert, E. (2017). Checklist of the land and freshwater Gastropoda of Europe. Last update: July 16th, 2017

External links

roblesi
Molluscs of Europe
Endemic fauna of Spain
Gastropods described in 2000